ATP synthase subunit O, mitochondrial is an enzyme that in humans is encoded by the ATP5PO gene.

The protein encoded by this gene is a component of the F-type ATPase found in the mitochondrial matrix. F-type ATPases are composed of a catalytic core and a membrane proton channel. The encoded protein appears to be part of the connector linking these two components and may be involved in transmission of conformational changes or proton conductance.

References

External links

Further reading